Anouk Faivre-Picon (born 18 February 1986) is a French cross-country skier.  She competed at the 2014 Winter Olympics in Sochi, in skiathlon and women's classical.

Cross-country skiing results
All results are sourced from the International Ski Federation (FIS).

Olympic Games

World Championships

World Cup

References

External links
 
 
 
 

1986 births
Living people
Cross-country skiers at the 2014 Winter Olympics
Cross-country skiers at the 2018 Winter Olympics
French female cross-country skiers
Olympic cross-country skiers of France
Tour de Ski skiers
People from Pontarlier
Sportspeople from Doubs
Universiade bronze medalists for France
Universiade medalists in cross-country skiing
Medalists at the 2011 Winter Universiade
21st-century French women